Rivers are natural flowing watercourses.

Rivers may also refer to:

Music
 Rivers (album), a 2010 album by Wildbirds & Peacedrums
 "Rivers" (song), a 2015 song by Thomas Jack
 "Rivers", a 2016 song by Chevelle from The North Corridor
 "Rivers (of the Hidden Funk)", a 1981 song by Joe Walsh from There Goes the Neighborhood

People
 Rivers (surname)
 Rivers Cuomo (born 1970), American musician
 Rivers Rutherford (born 1967), American country music songwriter

Places
 Rivers, Manitoba, Canada
 Rivers station, a railway station
 Rivers State, Nigeria
 Rivers, New Mexico, United States

Television and film
 Rivers (Holidays in the Danger Zone), a 2006 British documentary travel TV series
 Rivers with Griff Rhys Jones, a 2009 British documentary TV series
 Clear Rivers, a character from the Final Destination film series

Titles
 Earl Rivers, a title in the Peerage of England
 Baron Rivers, four titles in various British peerages
 Rivers baronets, an extinct title in the Baronetage of England

Other uses
 Rivers-class ocean liner, a group of 19th-century German express liners
 Rivers School, in Weston, Massachusetts, US
 Rivers Casino (disambiguation)
 Shisen-sho or Rivers, a Japanese tile-based game
 Rivers FC, a Canadian soccer team
 Rivers United F.C., a Nigerian football team

See also
 
 
 Lists of rivers
 River (disambiguation)